Charles Coghlan may refer to:
 Charles Francis Coghlan (1842–1899), British actor
 Charles F. Coghlan (actor, born 1896) (1896–1972), Broadway actor, nephew of the above
 Charles Coghlan (politician), first Premier of Southern Rhodesia